Deoghar Assembly constituency   is an assembly constituency in  the Indian state of Jharkhand.

Overview
Deoghar Assembly constituency covers: Deoghar town and Mohanpur Police Stations and Jasidih Police Station (excluding Kusmil, Chanddih, Pathra and Basbariya gram panchayats) in Deoghar district.

Deoghar Assembly constituency is part of Godda (Lok Sabha constituency).

Members of Legislative Assembly 
2004: Suresh Kumar Paswan, Rashtriya Janata Dal
2005: Kameshwar Das, Janata Dal (United)
2009: Suresh Kumar Paswan, Rashtriya Janata Dal
2014: Narayan Das, Bharatiya Janata Party
2019: Narayan Das, Bharatiya Janata Party

See also
Mohanpur
List of states of India by type of legislature

References

Assembly constituencies of Jharkhand
Deoghar